Magic Kamison is a 2007 Philippine television drama fantasy anthology broadcast by GMA Network. Starring Gladys Guevarra, it premiered on February 4, 2007. The show concluded on June 17, 2007 with a total of 19 episodes.

The series is streaming online on YouTube.

Story One: The True Lindsay
Cast and characters
Nadine Samonte as Ava
Alfred Vargas as Jaren
Loudres Valera as Mimi Lazo
Iwa Moto as Lindsay/Laura
Carmi Martin
Joy Viado

Plot
Lindsay (Iwa Moto) is an ugly girl who works in a car shop together with her best friend Ava (Nadine Samonte), she was always ignored by the customers compared to Ava who always has a customer. As Chuchay (Gladys Guevarra) arrives in her life, she was given a chance to be beautiful. Chuchay let Lindsay borrow the Kamison in order to be beautiful. As Lindsay, she resigned from the car shop but when she wears the Magic Kamison, she turned into a beautiful girl, changing her name from Lindsay to Laura. Laura goes to the car shop to get a job. When Jaren (Alfred Vargas) meets her, Jaren changes his treatment with Ava as he falls for Laura. When she starts wearing the Kamison, her attitude changes from nice to evil, just to be with Jaren. But then Ava was left by Jaren, she and Lindsay fight. But in the end, Jaren was supposed to be killed by a man but instead, Laura takes the bullet for him. After she was shot, she transformed from Laura to Lindsay and they learned that Laura and Lindsay were one.

Story Two: Little Big Rufo
Cast and characters
Dingdong Dantes as Rudy
Karylle as Rianne
Mura as Rufo
Daniela Alvarado as Ava
Mimi Lazo as Evia
Yayo Aguila
Girlie Sevilla
Marcus Madrigal

Plot
The story begins when Chuchay returns to her Auntie. As she returns, she met a new helper of her Aunt named Rufo (Mura). When she learned that Rufo is falling in love with Rianne (Karylle), Chuchay let him wear the Kamison and he transforms into a tall man and handsome so that he changes his name from Rufo to Rudy (Dingdong Dantes), he begins to pursue to get the heart of Rianne. In the end, Rufo learns that his mother is the mom of Rianne (Yayo Aguila) but Rianne is just an adopted child.

Story Three: My Ghost Bride
Cast and characters
JC de Vera as Adrian
LJ Reyes as Misty
Sunshine Garcia
Benjie Paras
Beverly Salviejo
Goyong
Kris Martinez
Neil Ferrera

Plot
The story begins when Chuchay arrives in Baguio due to that her Aunt asks her to find her friend. But Chuchay was just so unlucky as she loses her wallet where the address was written. She then meets a ghost at the church named Misty (LJ Reyes), Misty was supposed to marry a man named Adrian (JC de Vera), but she didn't arrive at the wedding because she died so Chuchay let her borrowed the Kamison so she could talk to Adrian. Adrian thought that she didn't arrived at the wedding because Lizet (Sunshine Garcia) tells that she ran away with another man. When Adrian saw Misty, he gets very angry because she didn't arrive. Pancho (Benjie Paras) is another ghost who died also in the church is pursuing Misty to love him instead of Adrian. Misty explains her side but every time she tells it, the bell is ringing so she couldn't explain clearly. Lizet wants Adrian so she pretends pregnant and father is Adrian. Misty's body is missing but then Itoy (Goyong) knows where's her body and it's cared by the child's grandma. In the end, Lizet saw Itoy looking at the picture of Misty that's why Lizet asks Itoy what he knows about Misty. Itoy brings Misty to their house and there Lizet learns that Misty was saved. Lizet said that she has to go but she tells that she will just call somebody to help her pick up the body of Misty. Itoy returns to the house of Adrian because he forgets something in the house of Adrian. Lately, Adrian learns that Misty did not run with another man. They went to Itoy's house but they saw that Lizet pick-ups Misty's body. The finale ends when Adrian and Misty were married while Chuchay will return to Manila for a new mission.

Story Four: Black Jewel in the Palace
Cast
Jewel Mische as Luming/Mina
Paulo Avelino as Poy
Chuck Allie as Charlie
Dion Ignacio as Aloy
German Moreno
Chanda Romero
Tuesday Vargas
Ella V
Hero Bautista

Plot
The story starts when Luming (Jewel Mische) will be brought to the house of her relatives. While Chuchay already arrives in Manila, she worried about her aunt because she didn't get her job in the Baguio so she thinks a way to not be punished but her aunt is not in the shop but her another aunt will be the one who guards the shop. On the other side, Luming already brought to her relatives, she was treated by her relative as a servant and teased due to her color but Don Vino (German Moreno) treats her as an own daughter. When Sutla (Tuesday Vargas) and Patty (Ella V.) goes to the shop with Luming as a helper, Chuchay meets Luming and saw how does her cousins treat her, she is very sad about that. When Luming already went home, Chuchay talks to the Kamison for Luming to wear by Luming for her to be beautiful but the Kamison didn't allow her to be borrowed by Luming. When she arrives, Don Vino is missing so Luming and her friends find him. As they search for Don Vino, Luming and Poy (Paulo Avelino) meet a handsome guy named Charlie (Chuck Allie) because Charlie is searching the location of Palacio Del Bianco where Don Vino lives. On the other side, Whitey (Hero Bautista) found Don Vino but before that she meets Chuchay and he falls in love with Chuchay. When Luming arrives in the house, Don Vino ios already there. Luming cooks food for dining time and Charlie said that he cooks well. One day, Luming went to Chuchay, Chuchay already convinces Luming to wear the Kamison. When she arrives home, she tried to wear the Kamison and she became a very beautiful girl. Later on, she brought something in a food chain where Charlie is, she forgets her wallet and Charlie gives it to her and asked her, she changed her name from Luming into Mina. Don Vino gives Luming when she is feeding her a lot of jewelry. Sutla and Patty stole it later on. While on the restaurant, Mina heard them talking about the jewelry. At home, Don Vino founds the jewelry at the bedroom of Sutla and Patty.

Accolades

References

External links
 

2007 Philippine television series debuts
2007 Philippine television series endings
Filipino-language television shows
GMA Network original programming
Philippine anthology television series